Voss Tidende was a Norwegian newspaper, published in Voss in Hordaland county.

Voss Avis was started in 1906. It changed its name to Voss Tidende in 1912, but went defunct in 1913. It was meant to be an oppositional organ to Hordaland, but it failed.

References

Newspapers established in 1906
Publications disestablished in 1913
Defunct newspapers published in Norway
Mass media in Voss
1906 establishments in Norway
1913 disestablishments in Norway